Cyligramma duplex is a moth of the family Noctuidae. It is found in Madagascar.

Catocalinae
Moths of Madagascar
Owlet moths of Africa